United States presidential vacations, or vacations taken by the presidents of the United States, have often been contentious.

History
Since the time of Ulysses S. Grant in 1874, Martha's Vineyard has been a popular vacation site for presidents. Presidents who have taken a vacation there include Presidents John F. Kennedy, Bill Clinton, and Barack Obama.

The presidential vacations can be risky in terms of popularity and practical safety:

John Adams was criticized for spending time caring for his ailing wife.
James Garfield was shot while leaving Washington for his vacation.
Theodore Roosevelt was criticized for leaving Washington for months at a time.
Franklin Roosevelt was criticized for spending time on his yacht.
George W. Bush was often criticized by Democrats for taking long vacations to his ranch in Crawford, Texas during the Iraq war.
Barack Obama's vacations have been scrutinized by the media. During the 2007–2012 recession he was criticized for vacationing at Martha's Vineyard.
Donald Trump: In May 2019 Trump was criticized for various expenses; such as, golf trips having cost taxpayers at least $102 million in extra travel and security expenses, trips to Florida having cost $81 million, his trips to New Jersey costing $17 million, his 2018 two days in Scotland costing at least $3 million, and $1 million for a trip to his resort in Los Angeles. During most of his presidency, he used the concept of "working-vacations" to justify most of his trips, especially after making remarks such as "I would not be a president who took vacations. I would not be a president that takes time off."

Known totals

Sources:

References

External links

 "Top Presidential Vacation Spots", The Washington Times

Presidency of the United States